Lasthenia californica is a species of flowering plant in the family Asteraceae known by the common name California goldfields. It is native to western North America.

Description
L. californica is an annual herb approaching a maximum height near , but generally staying much smaller. The plant is quite variable in appearance across subspecies and climates. Individuals growing along the coast may have fleshy leaves.

The head contains many yellow disc florets with a fringe of about 10 small ray florets. Large populations of this species bloom at once in the spring to produce the carpets of yellow on hillsides and in meadows that give the plant its common name. The seed sometimes has brownish scales at the tip.

Crocidium multicaule is similar in appearance, but most of its leaves are in a basal rosette, with alternate leaves on the stem.

Taxonomy
The species is placed by some in the genus Baeria.

Distribution and habitat
The plant can be found in California, Oregon, Arizona and Baja California. It thrives in open fields and slopes at low elevations, especially in poor grassless soils with adequate moisture.

References

External links

Jepson Manual Treatment: Lasthenia californica
Calflora-Lasthenia californica
USDA Plants Profile — Lasthenia californica (California Goldfields)
Lasthenia californica (California Goldfields) — U.C. Photo gallery

californica
Flora of California
Flora of Oregon
Flora without expected TNC conservation status